Tumbling Waters is an outer rural location in Darwin. The name of the locality derived from the town which was named after the rapids "Tumbling Waters" where R C Burton discovered gold in 1869.

References

External links

Suburbs of Darwin, Northern Territory